Paul Grant (born 27 October 1987 in Balclutha, New Zealand) is a New Zealand rugby union player. He played in the number 8 (and occasionally lock) position for the provincial based ITM Cup side Otago, and was the captain for the side during 2012 and 2013. He was captain when Otago lifted the Ranfurly Shield for the first time in 57 years. He has also represented New Zealand in sevens rugby since 2008.

In October 2013, it was announced Paul Grant would leave Otago in November 2013 to join French club Montpellier. In April 2014, it was announced that Grant had signed with Nottingham for the 2014-15 season.

Grant returned to England to sign Bath in the Premiership Rugby competition from the 2016-17 season. On 10 April 2019, Grant would leave Bath to return to the RFU Championship with Ealing Trailfinders from the 2019-20 season.

References

External links
 Otago Rugby profile

1987 births
Living people
Expatriate rugby union players in England
Expatriate rugby union players in France
Male rugby sevens players
Montpellier Hérault Rugby players
New Zealand expatriate rugby union players
New Zealand expatriate sportspeople in England
New Zealand expatriate sportspeople in France
New Zealand international rugby sevens players
New Zealand male rugby sevens players
New Zealand rugby union players
Nottingham R.F.C. players
Otago rugby union players
Rugby union flankers
Rugby union number eights
Rugby union players from Balclutha, New Zealand